Kahlee Jacoby Hamler (born July 8, 1999) is an American football wide receiver for the Denver Broncos of the National Football League (NFL). He played college football at Penn State.

Early years
Hamler moved from his hometown, Pontiac, Michigan, to Florida to play his final year of high school football as a senior at IMG Academy. Before his first career game at IMG Academy, he tore his ACL. Prior to transferring to IMG Academy, Hamler was a two year letterman at St. Mary's Preparatory School in Orchard Lake, Michigan. He was rated as a four-star prospect by ESPN, Rivals and Scout and a three star prospect by 247Sports. He also ran track for two seasons.

College career

Freshman year
Hamler redshirted as a freshman at Penn State due to suffering a torn ACL the previous year.

Redshirt freshman year
In the first game of his collegiate career against Appalachian State, Hamler returned a kickoff 52 yards with less than two minutes on the clock to help spark Penn State's game-tying drive. He capped the drive off with a 15-yard touchdown reception with under a minute remaining, ending the game with 3 catches for 67 yards and a TD. Against Ohio State, Hamler was awarded Big Ten Freshman of the Week honors after recording four receptions for 138 yards, including a 93-yard touchdown. Through five games, Hamler recorded 13 receptions for 308 yards and four touchdowns in his first season as a collegiate athlete.

Redshirt sophomore year
In the 2019 season, Hamler recorded 56 receptions for 904 receiving yards and eight receiving touchdowns.

Professional career

Hamler was selected by the Denver Broncos with the 46th overall pick in the second round of the 2020 NFL Draft.

2020 season
In Week 2, Hamler made his NFL debut and recorded three receptions for 48 receiving yards in a 26–21 loss to the Pittsburgh Steelers. In Week 8 against the Los Angeles Chargers, Hamler recorded his first career touchdown catch with no time remaining on the clock to help the Broncos win the game 31–30. In Week 14 against the Carolina Panthers, Hamler recorded two receptions for 86 yards and two touchdowns during the 32–27 victory. On January 2, 2021, Hamler was placed on injured reserve due to a hamstring injury. He finished his rookie season with 30 catches for 381 yards and three touchdowns.

2021 season
Trying to shake off the hamstring issues that plagued his rookie season, Hamler began training camp of his sophomore season in a crowded receiving corps. He shone early in preseason, catching a touchdown from Drew Lock during the Broncos' first preseason game against the Minnesota Vikings. He suffered a torn ACL in Week 3 and was placed on season-ending injured reserve on September 28, 2021.

2022 season
On December 3, 2022, Hamler was placed on injured reserve with a hamstring injury.

References

External links
Denver Broncos bio
Penn State Nittany Lions bio

1999 births
Living people
Sportspeople from Pontiac, Michigan
Players of American football from Michigan
IMG Academy alumni
American football wide receivers
Penn State Nittany Lions football players
Denver Broncos players
Ed Block Courage Award recipients